Thomas Thwaites (1 July 1910 – 24 May 2000) was an Australian cricketer. He played in one first-class match for Queensland in 1940/41.

See also
 List of Queensland first-class cricketers

References

External links
 

1910 births
2000 deaths
Australian cricketers
Queensland cricketers
Cricketers from Queensland